L'ultimo testimone is the seventh studio album by the Italian rapper Bassi Maestro, released on 19 November 2004 under Vibrarecords.

Track listing

Link 

2004 albums
Bassi Maestro albums